Eutresis was a town in ancient Arcadia, in the district Eutresia.

Its site is unlocated.

References

Populated places in ancient Arcadia
Former populated places in Greece
Lost ancient cities and towns